Choe Myong-ho (Chosŏn'gŭl: 최명호, born 3 July 1988) is a North Korean former footballer.

Career
Born in Pyongyang, Choe was one of the first native North Koreans to join a club abroad, Krylia Sovetov Samara of the Russian Premier League and the first to play in Russia.

He was selected as the 2005 AFC Youth Player of the Year.

Before moving to Russia, Choe Myong-ho had played for the Ministry of Light Industry team (Kyonggongop) in the DPR Korea League of his native country.

Due to his remarkable skills and talent the player has been called the "North Korean Ronaldo".

Despite moving to the Russian club in 2006, Choe only made his full debut for the first team on 27 June 2007, in the Russian Cup, as Krylia Sovetov lost to KAMAZ Naberezhnye Chelny, by a single goal.

Choe wasn't registered by Krylia to play in the 2009 season.

International career
He was a member of his country's U-17 national team and took part in the 2005 FIFA U-17 World Championship (scoring three times in four games), as well as the 2006 AFC U-17 Championship.

International goals

References

External links

1988 births
Living people
Expatriate footballers in Russia
PFC Krylia Sovetov Samara players
North Korean footballers
North Korean expatriate footballers
North Korean expatriate sportspeople in Russia
Sportspeople from Pyongyang
Pyongyang Sports Club players
2011 AFC Asian Cup players
Kyonggongopsong Sports Club players
Russian Premier League players
Asian Young Footballer of the Year winners
Footballers at the 2010 Asian Games
Expatriate footballers in Cambodia
Association football midfielders
Asian Games competitors for North Korea
North Korea international footballers